"You Overdid It Doll" is the first single from The Courteeners' second album, Falcon. It was released on 15 February 2010 as both a digital download and CD single. As of 21 February 2010, the single has peaked at #28 on the UK Singles Chart, making it The Courteeners's fifth UK Top 40 single.  As of 2021, it remains their last UK Top 40 hit.

Chart performance
"You Overdid It Doll" was released on 15 February 2010 as a CD single. On 21 February 2010, the single entered the UK Singles Chart for the first time, managing to reach a current peak of #28. "You Overdid It Doll" is now The Courteeners's third single to enter the Top 30.

Track listing
 CD
 "You Overdid It Doll"
 "I Never Wanted To"

 7" (1)
 "You Overdid It Doll"
 "Whites of Her Eyes"

 7" (2)
 "You Overdid It Doll (Live from Manchester Central 11/12/09)"
 "Social Fireworks"

 EP
 "You Overdid It Doll" (Live from Manchester Central)
 "I Never Wanted To"
 "Whites of Her Eyes"
 "Social Fireworks"

References

2010 singles
The Courteeners songs
2010 songs
Polydor Records singles
Song recordings produced by Ed Buller